Arnold Herbert Maltby (1 August 1913 – 25 August 2003) was an Australian rules footballer who played for the Essendon Football Club and North Melbourne Football Club in the Victorian Football League (VFL).

He later served in the Australian Army during World War II.

Notes

External links 

	
Arnold Maltby's playing statistics from The VFA Project

1913 births
2003 deaths
Australian rules footballers from Victoria (Australia)
Essendon Football Club players
North Melbourne Football Club players
Port Melbourne Football Club players
Australian Army personnel of World War II
Australian Army soldiers